Manchi  is a village in the southern state of Karnataka, India.  The village has most of the lands under agriculture.  Over 90% of people are literate.
nearest town is B.C Road which is 12 km from Manchi. In Manchi there is a primary school established in 1950 and a high school.  Roads connect B.C Road, Vitla, Mangalore and Kalladka. It is located in the Bantwal taluk of Dakshina Kannada district in Karnataka. The office of the gram panchayath is in Kukkaje.

Demographics
As of the 2011 India census, Manchi had a population of 6981 with 3485 males and 3496 females. The major languages spoken are Tulu, Byari, Konkani and Kannada.

Facilities
This is a rural area, with basic facilities like educational institutions, road-transport facility, electricity, telephone, stationery-grocery shops, irrigation, hospital, bank, and post office.

Personalities
B V Karanth (dramatist)

Agriculture 
Areca nut has emerged as a main crop along with coconut, paddy, black pepper, vanilla, cocoa, banana, and vegetables. Rubber plantations have been introduced in non-agricultural land and dry land.

See also
 Dakshina Kannada
 Districts of Karnataka

References

External links
 http://dk.nic.in/

Villages in Dakshina Kannada district